Etna Park is a park near the town of Buckley.

The area was a clay hole during the Industrial Revolution, and was later used as a landfill. The site has now been reclaimed, and has areas of wildflower meadow and woodland, and provides views across Cheshire, the Wirral and Merseyside.

References
 

Parks in Flintshire